Matthias Hattenberger (born 30 November 1978) is an Austrian professional association football player. He plays as a midfielder. His father, Roland Hattenberger, was also a footballer and played 51 matches for Austria.

References

1978 births
Living people
Austrian footballers
Association football midfielders
FC Wacker Innsbruck (2002) players
FC Kärnten players
FK Austria Wien players
First Vienna FC players
Austrian Football Bundesliga players
People from Kufstein
Footballers from Tyrol (state)
FC Tirol Innsbruck players